Vlad Cotuna (born 4 November 1990) is a Romanian gymnast. He competed at the 2012 Summer Olympics.

References

External links
 

1990 births
Living people
Romanian male artistic gymnasts
Olympic gymnasts of Romania
Gymnasts at the 2012 Summer Olympics
Sportspeople from Timișoara
European Games competitors for Romania
Gymnasts at the 2015 European Games